The Necklace of Harmonia, also called the Necklace of Eriphyle, was a fabled object in Greek mythology that, according to legend, brought great misfortune to all of its wearers or owners, who were primarily queens and princesses of the ill-fated House of Thebes.

Background
Hephaestus, blacksmith of the Olympian gods, discovered his wife, Aphrodite, goddess of love, having a sexual affair with Ares, the god of war. He became enraged and vowed to avenge himself for Aphrodite's infidelity by cursing any lineage of children resulting from the affair.  Aphrodite bore a daughter, Harmonia, from Ares' seed.  Harmonia grew up and was later betrothed to Cadmus of Thebes.  Upon hearing of the royal engagement, Hephaestus presented Harmonia with an exquisite necklace and robe as a wedding gift.  In some versions of the myth, only the necklace is given.  In either case, the necklace was wrought by Hephaestus' own hand and was cursed to bring disaster to any who wore it.

Magical properties
The magical necklace, referred to simply as the Necklace of Harmonia, allowed any woman wearing it to remain eternally young and beautiful. It thus became a much-coveted object amongst women of the House of Thebes in Greek myths.  Although no solid description of the Necklace exists, it is usually described in ancient Greek passages as being of beautifully wrought gold, in the shape of two serpents whose open mouths formed a clasp, and inlaid with various jewels.

Owners
Harmonia and Cadmus were both later transformed into serpents (dragons in some versions of the myth).  The extent of their suffering as a result of Harmonia wearing the Necklace is debatable because Cadmus and Harmonia are said to have ascended to the paradise of the Elysian Fields after their transformation. The Necklace then went to Harmonia's daughter Semele. She wore it the very day that Hera visited her and insinuated that her husband was not really Zeus. This led to Semele's destruction when she foolishly demanded that Zeus prove his identity by displaying himself in all his glory as the lord of heaven.

Several generations later, Queen Jocasta wore the legendary Necklace. It allowed her to retain her youth and beauty. Thus, after  the death of her husband King Laius, she unknowingly married her own son, Oedipus.  When the truth about Oedipus was later discovered,  Jocasta committed suicide, and Oedipus tore out his own eyes.  The descendants and relations of Oedipus all suffered various personal tragedies, as described in Sophocles' "Three Theban Plays": Oedipus Rex, Oedipus at Colonus, and Antigone.

Polynices then inherited the Necklace. He gave it to Eriphyle, so that she might use it to persuade her husband, Amphiaraus, to undertake the expedition against Thebes.  This led to the death of Eriphyle, Alcmaeon, Phegeus, and the latter's sons.  Through Alcmaeon, the son of Eriphyle, the necklace then came into the hands of Phegeus' daughter Arsinoe (named Alphesiboea in some versions), then to the sons of Phegeus, Pronous and Agenor, and lastly to the sons of Alcmaeon, Amphoterus and Acarnan.  Amphoterus and Acarnan dedicated the Necklace to the Temple of Athena at Delphi, to prevent further disaster amongst human wearers.  

The tyrant Phayllus, one of the Phocian leaders in the Third Sacred War (356 BC-346 BC),  stole the necklace from the Temple and offered it to his mistress. After she had worn it for a time, her son was seized with madness and set fire to the house, where she perished in the flames along with all her worldly treasures. No additional legends about the cursed Necklace of Harmonia exist after the story of Phayllus's mistress.

See also
 Brísingamen, a necklace owned by the North Germanic goddess Freyja

 Heimskringla Chapter 24, Ynglingatal 12, Skald I 28

External links
Michael Stewart - Greek Mythology: From the Iliad to the Fall of the Last Tyrant 
Theoi Project - Harmonia
Greek Mythology Link (Carlos Parada) - Robe & Necklace of Harmonia 

Greek mythology
Mythological clothing
Necklaces